Antony John Wassermann (born 1957) is a British mathematician working in operator algebras. He is known for his works on conformal field theory (providing several series of subfactors), on the actions of compact groups on von Neumann algebras, and his proof of the Baum–Connes conjecture for connected reductive linear Lie groups.

Biography 
Wassermann is the son of the quantum physicist Gerhard Dietrich Wassermann and the brother of the mathematician Alexander Simon Wassermann. He attended Royal Grammar School, Newcastle upon Tyne, from 1968 to 1974, and received his PhD at the University of Pennsylvania in 1981, under the supervision of Jonathan Rosenberg (Automorphic actions of compact groups on operator algebras). Afterwards, he was Directeur de Recherches CNRS at Aix-Marseille University (France) from 1999 to 2013.

He is currently affiliated with the Department of Pure Mathematics and Mathematical Statistics (DPMMS) at the University of Cambridge.

Honours 
 Bronze medal, International Mathematical Olympiad, 1974.
 Miller Research Fellowship recipient in 1986–88.
 Winner of the Whitehead Prize in 1990.
 Invited speaker, International Congresses of Mathematicians, 1994, Zürich.

Selected bibliography
 Operator algebras and conformal field theory. III. Fusion of positive energy representations of LSU(N) using bounded operators. Invent. Math. 133, no. 3, 467–538, 1998. MR1645078
 Operator algebras and conformal field theory. Proceedings of the International Congress of Mathematicians, Vol. 1, 2 (Zürich, 1994), 966–979, Birkhäuser, Basel, 1995. MR1403996
 Ergodic actions of compact groups on operator algebras. I. General theory. Ann. of Math. (2) 130, no. 2, 273–319, 1989. MR1014926
 Ergodic actions of compact groups on operator algebras. III. Classification for SU(2). Invent. Math. 93, no. 2, 309–354, 1988. MR948104
 Une démonstration de la conjecture de Connes–Kasparov pour les groupes de Lie linéaires connexes réductifs [A proof of the Connes–Kasparov conjecture for connected reductive linear Lie groups], C. R. Acad. Sci. Paris Sér. I Math. 304, no. 18, 559–562, 1987. MR894996

References

External links 
ResearchGate

DPMMS

IML

20th-century English mathematicians
University of Pennsylvania alumni
Whitehead Prize winners
International Mathematical Olympiad participants
21st-century English mathematicians
Living people
Academic staff of Aix-Marseille University
1957 births
Cambridge mathematicians
People educated at the Royal Grammar School, Newcastle upon Tyne